Rendel is a surname, and may refer to

Sir Alexander Meadows Rendel (1828–1918), English civil engineer
Alexander Meadows Rendel (Sandy Rendel) (1910–1991) SOE agent 
David Rendel (1949–2016), British politician
Emma Rendel (born 1976), Swedish graphic novel author
George Wightwick Rendel (1833–1902), British engineer and naval architect
George William Rendel (1889–1979), British diplomat
Hamilton Owen Rendel (1843–1902), British engineer, designer of the hydraulic system for the Tower Bridge.
James Meadows Rendel (engineer) (1799–1856), British civil engineer
James Meadows Rendel (geneticist) (1915–2001), Australian agricultural scientist
Leila Rendel (1882–1969), English social worker, granddaughter of Sir Alexander Rendel
Robert Rendel (1885–1944), British film actor, younger brother of Leila Rendel
Stuart Rendel, 1st Baron Rendel (1834–1913), British industrialist, philanthropist and politician
Martin Rendel (born 1968), German academic and cultural manager

See also
 Rendel (film), a 2017 Finnish superhero film
 Rendell